In mathematical analysis, Ekeland's variational principle, discovered by Ivar Ekeland, is a theorem that asserts that there exist nearly optimal solutions to some optimization problems.

Ekeland's principle can be used when the lower level set of a minimization problems is not compact, so that the Bolzano–Weierstrass theorem cannot be applied. The principle relies on the completeness of the metric space.

The principle has been shown to be equivalent to completeness of metric spaces.
In proof theory, it is equivalent to ΠCA0 over RCA0, i.e. relatively strong.

It also leads to a quick proof of the Caristi fixed point theorem.

History

Ekeland was associated with the Paris Dauphine University when he proposed this theorem.

Ekeland's variational principle

Preliminary definitions

A function  valued in the extended real numbers  is said to be  if  and it is called  if it has a non-empty , which by definition is the set 

The map  is proper and bounded below if and only if  or equivalently, if and only if 

Statement of the theorem

Corollaries

A good compromise is to take  in the preceding result.

See also

References

Bibliography

 
 
 
  

Convex analysis
Theorems in functional analysis
Variational analysis
Variational principles